T. camphoratus can refer to a few different species.  The specific epithet  refers to 'camphor.'

 Taiwanofungus camphoratus, a mushroom known as stout camphor fungus 
 Tarchonanthus camphoratus, a shrub known as camphor bush or leleshwa
 Thymus camphoratus, a species of thyme in the genus Thymus